Bert Lindarw (1930–2020) was an international speedway rider from Sweden.

Speedway career 
Lindarw was twice a finalist at the Individual Speedway Long Track World Championship in 1957 and 1961. He won a silver medal (1953) and one bronze medal (1952) at the Swedish Individual Speedway Championship.

He rode in Sweden for the Smederna Blacksmiths.

Family
His son is Christer Lindarw.

References 

1930 births
2020 deaths
Swedish speedway riders